Jinmu Cape, is administered as part of Sanya City, Hainan Island, China. It is some 20 km (12 miles) from Sanya itself.  The cape is notable for being the southernmost point of China (China's territorial claims to the Spratly Islands notwithstanding).  A lighthouse is situated upon it.

In 1996, the Chinese government announced that Jinmu Cape was to be considered one of China's maritime baselines.

External links 
  Declaration of the Government of the People's Republic of China on the baselines of the territorial sea (15 May, 1996)
 Locate Jinmu cape on GOOGLEMAPS

Landforms of Hainan
Headlands of China